Ajjihalli may refer to:

Ajjihalli, Davanagere, a village in  the state of Karnataka, India
Ajjihalli, Uttara Kannada, a village in the state of Karnataka, India